Landazuri may refer to :

Landazuri is a town and municipality in the Santander Department in northeastern Colombia, South America.
Héctor Landazuri is a Colombian football goalkeeper currently playing for Once Caldas in the Copa Mustang.
Juan Landázuri Ricketts (December 19, 1913, Arequipa, Peru – January 16, 1997, Lima, Peru) was one of the most prominent Roman Catholic Churchmen during the 1960s and 1970s in Latin America.